Cas is a masculine given name and nickname, as well as a surname. It may refer to:

People
 Cas Anvar, Canadian actor, voice actor, and writer
 Cas Cremers (born 1974), Dutch computer scientist and professor of Information Security at the University of Oxford
 Cas Haley (born 1980), American singer/singerwriter
 Cas Mudde (born 1967), Dutch political scientist
 Cas Oorthuys (1908–1975), Dutch photographer and designer known as Cas
 Cas Spijkers (1946–2011), Dutch chef and cookbook author
 Cas Walker (1902–1998), American businessman, politician, and television and radio personality
 nickname of James Castrission (born 1982), half of Cas and Jonesy, Australian explorers, endurance athletes and motivational speakers
 Katarina Čas (born 1976), Slovenian actress
 Marcel Cas (born 1972), Dutch former footballer

Other
 Cas Corach, a hero in Irish mythology
 Tál Cas, Dynastic founder of the Dál gCais

Masculine given names
Dutch masculine given names